This article shows the rosters of all participating teams at the men's basketball tournament at the 2015 Pan American Games in Toronto. Rosters could have a maximum of 12 athletes.

Argentina
The Argentina men's national basketball team roster for the 2015 Pan American Games.

Brazil
The Brazil men's national basketball team roster for the 2015 Pan American Games.

Canada
The Canada men's national basketball team roster for the 2015 Pan American Games.

Dominican Republic
The Dominican Republic men's national basketball team roster for the 2015 Pan American Games.

Mexico
The Mexico men's national basketball team roster for the 2015 Pan American Games.

Puerto Rico
The Puerto Rico men's national basketball team roster for the 2015 Pan American Games.

United States
The United States men's national basketball team roster for the 2015 Pan American Games.

Venezuela
The Venezuela men's national basketball team roster for the 2015 Pan American Games.

References

Basketball at the 2015 Pan American Games – Men's tournament
Basketball squads at the Pan American Games